is a Japanese film director, producer and editor, and founder of the Japanese documentary and adult video (AV) studio V&R Planning.

Life and career
Kaoru Adachi was born  in Tokyo. He initially worked in the TV industry mainly as an import agent for foreign films and is credited by former associate Company Matsuo with introducing Monty Python to Japan.

V&R Planning
In April 1986, Adachi founded the film studio V&R Planning in Tokyo. The V&R stands for "Visual and Retail". According to Matsuo, Adachi didn't know how to shoot films but was interested in "weird documentaries", especially those involving death, so he just "shot documentaries the way he thought they should be."

V&R Planning, under the Mad Video label, distributed the Japanese versions of the first three videos in the US Faces of Death series as Janku or Junk. Around 1989, Adachi along with Company Matsuo and a cameraman traveled to Brazil to film death scenes for Shin janku ("New Junk"), known in the US as Faces of Death 4, for which Adachi received co-director credit. Dark Side magazine noted his involvement with this series in an article "A Death Dealer - Susumu Saegusa" in issue #124 for December/January 2007. He also did a further series of death videos called  again under the Mad Video label.

In another vein, Adachi produced and edited Katsuyuki Hirano's award-winning 1999 film Shiro - The White, a documentary of a solo bike ride to northern Hokkaido during a blizzard.

AV director
Adachi directed a number of videos with AV Idol Yumika Hayashi at V&R Planning from as early as 1990 in his  series. He also directed another AV series titled .

Uncensored videos
Uncensored videos, those without the mosaic pixelation to obscure the genitals which is necessary for all Japanese porn, are sold and licensed to international distributors via the V&R Planning subsidiary V&R International with headquarters in Brazil. Adachi has directed a number of these uncensored videos including the "Woman Teacher in Black" series which were uncensored versions of his "Urination Class" series, the "House of Gomorrah" series and the "Domination High" series. From 2007, he also directed several uncensored videos from the scatology fetish series made under the VXR label for V&R International. Among his later works for V&R International is the June 2008 release A Fuckwork Orange: Return of Lasses in Hell (XV-065) which combines lesbian domination and humiliation, urination, and cockroaches and maggots.

Sources
 
 *

References

Japanese film directors
Japanese pornographic film directors
Japanese documentary filmmakers
Japanese film producers
1956 births
Living people
People from Tokyo